Carex stenostachys is a tussock-forming species of perennial sedge in the family Cyperaceae. It is native to parts of Japan.

See also
List of Carex species

References

stenostachys
Taxa named by Adrien René Franchet
Taxa named by Ludovic Savatier
Plants described in 1878
Flora of Japan